Brian McKeown (born 31 October 1956) is a Scottish former footballer who played as a central defender for Fauldhouse United, Airdrieonians, Queen of the South and Shotts Bon Accord.

See also
 List of footballers in Scotland by number of league appearances (500+)

References

1956 births
Living people
Scottish footballers
Fauldhouse United F.C. players
Airdrieonians F.C. (1878) players
Queen of the South F.C. players
Shotts Bon Accord F.C. players
Scottish Football League players
Association football defenders
Footballers from Motherwell
Scottish Junior Football Association players